Al-Selmiyah Club  is a Saudi Arabian football team in Al-Kharj City playing at the Saudi Third Division.

Ascending to Second Division
He promoted to the Saudi Second Division after the decision of the Saudi Arabian Football Federation to ascend 8 clubs.

Current squad 

As of Saudi Third Division:

References

Selmiyah
1979 establishments in Saudi Arabia
Association football clubs established in 1979